1492: Conquest of Paradise is a 1992 epic historical drama film directed and produced by Ridley Scott and starring Gérard Depardieu, Armand Assante, and Sigourney Weaver. It portrays a version of the travels to the New World by the Genovese-Castillian explorer Christopher Columbus and the effect this had on indigenous peoples.

The film was released to celebrate the 500th anniversary of Columbus' voyage. The premiere debuted less than two months after Christopher Columbus: The Discovery by John Glen, often leading to confusion between the two films. The film received mixed to negative reviews, with particular criticism aimed at the film's historical inaccuracies.

Plot

Aware that the world is round, Christopher Columbus lobbies for a trip westward to Asia, but lacks a crew and ship. The Catholic theologians at the University of Salamanca heavily disapprove of Columbus's plan, not being keen on ideas that go against the writings of Ptolemaeus. Columbus is approached by Martín Pinzón, a shipowner from Palos, who introduces him to the banker Santángel, to whom Queen Isabella I owes money. Columbus meets with the queen, who grants him his journey in exchange for his promise to bring back sufficient amounts of riches in gold.

Columbus deceives many crewmen by telling them that the voyage will only last seven weeks. Three ships depart. Nine weeks go by with no sign of land. The crew becomes restless and edges toward mutiny. He tries to reinvigorate them with an inspiring speech, coinciding with a fast wind, which goads the men to return to their duties. At night, Columbus notices mosquitoes on the deck, indicating that land is not far off. Suddenly, out of the mist they see the lush vegetation and sandy beaches of Guanahani.

The Europeans befriend the local natives, who show them gold they have collected. Columbus teaches one of them Spanish so that they are able to communicate. He then informs them that he will return to Spain, which will be followed by the arrival of many more Europeans. Columbus leaves behind a group to begin the colonisation of the Americas. Back in Spain, he receives a high honour from the queen and has dinner with the council. They express disappointment with the small amount of gold he brought back, but the queen approves of his gifts. On the second expedition, Columbus takes 17 ships and over 1,000 men with him to the island; however, all the crewmen left behind are found to have been killed. When the tribe is confronted by Columbus and his troops, they tell him that another tribe came and killed them. Columbus chooses to believe them, but his commanding officer Moxica is not convinced. They begin to build the city of La Isabela and eventually manage to hoist the town bell into its tower.

Four years later, the natives are being forced to mine for gold. Moxica punishes one who fails to find any gold by cutting off his hand. The word of this act of violence spreads throughout the native tribes and they all disappear into the forest. Columbus begins to worry about a potential war, with the natives heavily outnumbering them. Upon return to his home, he finds his house set ablaze by Moxica and his followers, confirming his unpopularity among a certain faction of the settlers. Soon, the tribes arrive to fight the Spaniards and the island becomes war-torn, with Columbus' governorship being reassigned with orders for him to return to Spain.

Columbus is accused of nepotism and offering administrative positions to his personal friends, thereby injuring the pride of the nobles such as Moxica; he is replaced by de Bobadilla. Columbus returns to Castile to be imprisoned, but is bailed out by his sons. When he is summoned by the queen, she is reluctantly convinced to allow him to make another voyage, with the proviso that he neither take his brothers nor return to the colonies. As an old man, Columbus is virtually forgotten in Spain, with the discovery of the New World being credited to Amerigo Vespucci. Columbus's son Ferdinand asks his father to tell him his story so he can transcribe it.

Cast

Music

Renowned Greek composer Vangelis composed the score. Its main theme, "Conquest of Paradise", was used by former Portuguese Prime-Minister António Guterres at his 1995 election and it was used by the Portuguese Socialist Party as its campaign and rally anthem, although it was replaced by the main theme from Gladiator (another Ridley Scott film) since the first José Sócrates legislative elections campaign, which doesn't prevent the theme from still being deeply associated with the Socialist Party.

Russia used it in the 2nd round of the 1996 Russian presidential election.

The theme is also used at the starting line of the Ultra-Trail du Mont-Blanc ultramarathon. The German boxer Henry Maske (former world champion (IBF) in the Light heavyweight category) used the main theme as his official entry theme during his professional career. Other usages of the theme include New Zealand Super 15 Rugby franchise the Canterbury Crusaders, as they run onto the field, often accompanied by actors dressed as knights and riding on horseback, and rugby league team Wigan Warriors who play in the Super League, as well as being played before the start of every match in the 2010 and 2014 cricket World Twenty20 championships as well as the 2011 Cricket World Cup. In these events the theme was played right before the national anthems of the two competing nations, as the flags of the two nations were carried into the ground, accompanied by the players of the two teams. The theme was also played in the Top Gear: US Special and became a signature piece for World Professional Champion figure skaters Anita Hartshorn and Frank Sweiding. Despite the film's dismal box office intake in the United States, the film's score became a successful album worldwide.

Reception

Box office
1492: Conquest of Paradise opened on 66 screens in Spain, grossing $1 million in its first five days. In the United States and Canada, it was released by Paramount Pictures on 9 October 1992 in 1,008 theaters. The version released there was edited to 150 minutes, with some violence and brutality removed in order to achieve a PG-13 rating. The film was a flop in the United States, debuting at number 7 with a gross of $3,002,680, worse than the opening of Christopher Columbus: The Discovery earlier in the year, and went on to gross just $7 million. It opened in France on 12 October 1992, grossing $1.46 million for the weekend from 264 screens. In its second week in Europe, it was the highest-grossing film with a gross of over $7.7 million, including $1.77 million in its opening week in Germany from 213 screens. It did not open well in Italy with $261,800 in its opening weekend from 33 screens. By the end of 1992, it had grossed $40 million internationally, for a worldwide total of $47 million. It went on to gross $59 million.

Director Ridley Scott later blamed the movie's failure on Americans not understanding European accents: "They don't hear shit unless it's from Texas or America, right?" and reflected: "It's one of my favorite films. What's interesting, they didn't know how to release it in America. But in Europe, it clocked $57 million."

Critical response
Overall, the film received mixed to negative reviews from critics, with the review aggregator Rotten Tomatoes giving the film a 32% rating based on 22 reviews with the critical consensus: "Historically inaccurate and dramatically inert, Ridley Scott's retelling of Christopher Columbus' exploits is an epic without grandeur or insight". However, film critic Roger Ebert said that the film was satisfactory, and that "Depardieu lends it gravity, the supporting performances are convincing, the locations are realistic, and we are inspired to reflect that it did indeed take a certain nerve to sail off into nowhere just because an orange was round." Audiences surveyed by CinemaScore gave the film a grade of "B+" on scale of A+ to F.

See also
Carry On Columbus, a comedy-film about Columbus released in 1992
The Magic Voyage, an animated film about Christopher Columbus also released in 1992

References

External links

1492 Conquest of Paradise at Rotten Tomatoes

1992 films
1990s historical adventure films
1990s biographical drama films
British biographical drama films
British epic films
French epic films
French biographical drama films
Spanish biographical drama films
Spanish epic films
1990s English-language films
1990s adventure drama films
Cultural depictions of Christopher Columbus
Cultural depictions of Isabella I of Castile
Films set in the 1490s
Fiction set in 1492
Films set in North America
Films set in the Caribbean
Films set in pre-Columbian America
Films set in Spain
Films shot in Costa Rica
Films shot in the Dominican Republic
Films shot in England
Films shot in Spain
Films shot in the United States Virgin Islands
Gaumont Film Company films
Films directed by Ridley Scott
Films scored by Vangelis
Age of Discovery films
Epic films based on actual events
English-language French films
English-language Spanish films
1992 drama films
1990s British films
1990s French films
1990s Spanish films